Leucadia State Beach, also known as Beacon's Beach, is a public beach in the city of Encinitas, California, United States. It is operated as Beacon’s Beach by the city under a 20-year agreement with the California Department of Parks and Recreation. Established in 1949, the  site is a popular spot for swimming, surfing, fishing, and other beach activities.

See also
List of California state parks

References

External links 
Leucadia State Beach

1949 establishments in California
Beaches of Southern California
California State Beaches
Beaches of San Diego County, California
Parks in San Diego County, California
Protected areas established in 1949